Wawatay Native Communications Society (Wawatay for short) was formed in 1974 by the people of Canada's Nishnawbe Aski Nation in the Kenora and Cochrane Districts of Northern Ontario, as a source of communications technology, namely radio, television, and print media services for the Oji-Cree communities. Its mandate is to preserve the indigenous language and culture in its service area. Wawatay's general office is located in Sioux Lookout, Ontario, with bureaus in Timmins and Thunder Bay.

Wawatay's mission statement says that they are "... dedicated to using appropriate technologies to meet the communication needs of people of Aboriginal ancestry in Northern Ontario, wherever they live."

Wawatay is the primary source of news for the remote areas of Northern Ontario.  The name comes from the Oji-Cree word for the aurora borealis.

Wawatay Radio 
The society operates two radio networks:

The Wawatay Radio Network (WRN; ᐙᐙᐦᑌ ᓇᐣᑐᐦᑕᒧᐎᐣ (Waawaate Nandotamowin); unpointed: ᐗᐗᑌ ᓇᑐᑕᒧᐎᐣ) is a network of radio stations that broadcasts news, talk, sports, local and popular music.  Native language and English are both heard. In many NAN communities the local WRN transmitter is the only station that can be picked up in the community without difficulty.
 
WRN operates the following stations:

 89.9 CKWT-FM Sioux Lookout, Ontario 106.7 CJWT-FM Timmins, Ontario with repeater stations:

 89.9 CKMT-FM Attawapiskat
 90.1 CFBL-FM Bearskin Lake
 89.9 CJPS-FM Cat Lake
 89.9 CKID-FM Constance Lake
 90.1 CKDL-FM Deer Lake
 90.1 CKFA-FM Fort Albany
 90.1 CKFS-FM Fort Severn
 90.1 CFKP-FM Kasabonika

 90.1 CKAS-FM Kashechewan
 90.1 CFKL-FM Kingfisher Lake
 89.9 CFHL-FM Lansdowne House
 105.1 CFMD-FM Muskrat Dam
 90.1 CFNP-FM Naicatchewenin
 89.9 CKFC-FM North Spirit Lake
 89.9 CKWN-FM Peawanuck/Winisk
 90.1 CFBY-FM Poplar Hill

 90.1 CFEY-FM Sachigo
 89.9 CHIX-FM Seine River
 90.1 CHBJ-FM Slate Falls
 89.9 CKYW-FM Summer Beaver
 89.9 CHIO-FM Wapekeka
 90.1 CHWL-FM Weagamow Lake
 90.1 CKPN-FM Webequie
 90.1 CHPM-FM Wunnumin Lake

WRN can also be heard nationwide on Bell Satellite TV channel 962.

Wahsa Radio is a network of radio stations that broadcasts educational distance learning and informational programming. The network is operated in conjunction with the Northern Nishnawbe Education Council.

Wahsa Radio is heard on the following stations:

 91.9 CIDE-FM Sioux Lookout, Ontario with repeater stations:

 91.9 CIDE-1 Bearskin Lake
 91.9 CIDE-2 Big Trout Lake
 91.9 CIDE-3 Cat Lake
 91.9 CIDE-4 Deer Lake
 91.9 CIDE-5 Fort Severn
 91.9 CIDE-6 Kasabonika
 91.9 CIDE-21 Keewaywin

 91.9 CIDE-7 Kingfisher Lake
 91.9 CIDE-8 Lac Seul
 91.9 CIDE-9 Muskrat Dam
 91.9 CIDE-10 North Spirit Lake
 91.9 CIDE-11 Osnaburgh
 91.9 CIDE-12 Pikangikum
 91.9 CIDE-13 Poplar Hill

 91.9 CIDE-14 Sachigo
 91.9 CIDE-15 Sandy Lake
 91.9 CIDE-16 Slate Falls
 91.9 CIDE-17 Wapekeka
 91.9 CIDE-18 Weagamow Lake
 91.9 CIDE-20 Webequie
 91.9 CIDE-19 Wunnumin Lake

Wahsa Radio can also be heard nationwide on Bell Satellite TV channel 972.

Wawatay TV 
Wawatay TV produces aboriginal TV productions which air nationally on the Aboriginal Peoples Television Network. The service also formerly leased time from the Ontario Parliament Network on its system of over-the-air transmitters in remote Northern Ontario communities.

Wawatay Television has produced many documentaries, children's programs such as Wawatay Kids TV, and outdoor shows.

Wawatay News 

Wawatay News (ᐙᐙᐦᑌ ᐋᒋᒧᐎᓇᐣ (Waawaate Aajimowinan); unpointed: ᐗᐗᑌ ᐊᒋᒧᐏᓇᐣ) and its digital version Wawatay News Online (ᐙᐙᐦᑌ ᐋᒋᒧᐎᓇᐣ ᐲᐙᐱᐦᑯᐣᐠ (Waawaate Aajimowinan Biiwaabikong); unpointed: ᐗᐗᑌ ᐊᒋᒧᐎᓇᐣ ᐱᐗᐱᑯᐠ) is a semi-monthly newspaper.  According to Wawatay, the newspaper is in a tabloid format, distributed free to the residents of 93 First Nations in Northern Ontario. It is also sold via newsstand dealer to many other communities in Northern Ontario with a subscription rate for readers outside of the general circulation territory. Total circulation is 9,300 copies with a reading audience of over 58,000 Aboriginal people.

References

External links

 Wawatay News Online

First Nations radio
Radio broadcasting companies of Canada
Television production companies of Canada
1974 establishments in Ontario
Sioux Lookout
Community radio organizations
Radio organizations in Canada
Nishnawbe Aski Nation
Indigenous television in Canada